Giovanni Pantaleoni (born 16 March 1978) is an Italian baseball player who competed in the 2004 Summer Olympics. Pantaleoni was born in Cupramontana, Italy.

As a member of Italy national baseball team he won 2012 European Baseball Championship.

References

1978 births
Living people
Olympic baseball players of Italy
Baseball players at the 2004 Summer Olympics
Rimini Baseball Club players
Fortitudo Baseball Bologna players
T & A San Marino players
Italian expatriate sportspeople in San Marino